Stephen Peter Banas (April 30, 1907 – May 10, 1974) was an American football player. He played college football for Notre Dame from 1931 to 1933, and professional football for the Detroit Lions and Philadelphia Eagles in 1935.  In July 1935, Banas became the football coach at St. Mary's College of Orchard Lake, Michigan, but he instead played professional football that fall.  Banas died in 1974 at age 67 in Gardena, California.

References

1907 births
1974 deaths
Sportspeople from Bridgeport, Connecticut
Notre Dame Fighting Irish football players
Detroit Lions players
Philadelphia Eagles players
Players of American football from Connecticut
Central High School (Connecticut) alumni